Indonesia and Kenya established diplomatic relations in 1979. Indonesia has an embassy in Nairobi, also accredited to Mauritius, Seychelles, and Uganda,  and in 2022 Kenya established its embassy in Jakarta. Both nations are partners in multilateral organizations, such as the World Trade Organization (WTO) and Non-Aligned Movement.

History
The official bilateral diplomatic relations between both countries was established in July 1979. During the period, the diplomatic affairs to Kenya was accredited to Indonesian embassy in Dar Es Salaam, Tanzania. Indonesian embassy in Nairobi officially established in April 1982. 
 
Indonesian and Kenyan foreign ministers have signed memorandum of understanding on 19 June 2008 in Nairobi, to establishes Joint Commission of Indonesia and Kenya. The commission serves as a forum to expands and improves cooperation sectors, also to solves bilateral problems. During their first meeting in Jakarta, 2–4 December 2008, the commission agreed to expands the cooperation in several sectors, such as economy, trade, social and culture, and technical cooperation. To improve people-to-people contact the commission has agreed on several cooperation possibilities, such as diplomats training, anti-terrorism drill, and athletics training.

Official visits
Kenyan Cabinet Secretary of Foreign Affairs Monica Juma visited Indonesia in 2019 she met with her Indonesian counterpart Retno Marsudi and they discussed issues such as deepening ties and the possibility of Kenya opening an embassy in 2020.

Trade
In 2016, bilateral trade was worth KES.21 billion (US$210.8 million) IDR. 2.9 trillion.

Kenya's main exports to Indonesia were:  tea and mate; Leather; Metallic salts and peroxysalts; Tobacco; vegetable textile fibres; Essential oils; Jute and other textile bast fibres; Vegetables, fresh, chilled, frozen; Coffee and coffee substitutes.

Indonesia's main exports to Kenya were: fixed vegetable fats (palm oil); Paper and paperboard; Textile yarn; Animal or vegetable fats and oils; Margarine and shortening; Natural rubber; Electrical machinery; electrical and non-electrical equipment; Glass; Articles of apparel and clothing accessories.

Kenya and Indonesia are taking steps towards signing a Preferential Trade Agreement.

Notes

External links
Embassy of the Republic of Indonesia in Nairobi, Kenya

 
Kenya
Bilateral relations of Kenya